Raman Srivastava was a 1973 batch Indian Police Service officer who served as the Director general of police in Kerala Police from February 2005 till November 2008. He is also a former Director General of the Border Security Force (BSF), the border patrol agency of the Government of India.

Career
Srivastava was a 1973 batch IPS officer of the Kerala cadre. Before becoming Director General of BSF, he was Special Secretary (Internal Security) in the Ministry of Home Affairs. Before that, he served as Director General of Police of Kerala and occupied various policing positions in a 33 year career. He also maintained very cordial relations with all parties and factions, notably K. Karunakaran, Oommen Chandy and Pinarayi Vijayan. In 2017, he was appointed by Pinarayi Vijayan as a special police advisor of the rank of the Chief Secretary.

Controversy

He was caught in a controversy following his alleged involvement in the ISRO spy ring case in the 1990s which was obviously a fake allegation on the part of other Indian Police Service officers investigating the case. Later, Supreme Court of India itself dismissed the case for being vague and baseless. He also dragged serious controversy over his alleged order resulting in the death of a 11-year-old girl named Sirajunnisa, during his tenure in the State of Kerala as the Deputy Inspector General of Police.

References

Indian police officers
Living people
Indian police chiefs
People from Kerala
Year of birth missing (living people)
Place of birth missing (living people)